Saint-Aubin-sur-Yonne (literally Saint-Aubin on Yonne) is a commune in the Yonne department in Bourgogne-Franche-Comté in north-central France. It is part of the canton of Joigny and the arrondissement of Sens. The inhabitants of Saint-Aubin-sur-Yonne called the Aubinois. The area is 8.9 square kilometers and the population is 409 (2018).

It is located at an altitude of 92 meters.

See also
Communes of the Yonne department

References

Communes of Yonne